Clejani is a commune in Giurgiu County, Muntenia, Romania, about 40 km south of Bucharest, in the Vlașca region (part of Muntenia), on the Danube Plains near the Bulgarian border. It is composed of four villages: Clejani, Neajlovu, Podu Doamnei and Sterea.

The commune is famous for its lăutari or gypsy musicians, especially the group Taraful Haiducilor (a.k.a. Taraf de Haïdouks) and members of the group Mahala Rai Banda.

References

Communes in Giurgiu County
Localities in Muntenia